James Norris Reynolds IV (born December 22, 1968) is a former American Major League Baseball umpire. Reynolds wore uniform number 77. He retired following the 2022 season.

Early career
Reynolds previously worked in the New York–Penn League (1992), South Atlantic League (1993), California League (1994), Eastern League (1995), Southern League (1996), American Association (1997) and the International League (1998).

Major league career
Reynolds joined the Major League Baseball umpiring staff in 1999 after the Major League Umpires Association mass resignations. He has worked 7 Division Series (2005, 2007, 2008, 2012, 2013, 2014, and 2018), 5 League Championship Series (2010, 2015, 2016, 2017, 2020) and 2 World Series (2014, 2018). He also umpired in the 2004 Major League Baseball All-Star Game.

Reynolds was the third base umpire for Rickey Henderson's 3,000th hit on October 7, 2001; that game was also Tony Gwynn's final MLB game. 

Reynolds was the second base umpire on May 29, 2010, when Roy Halladay threw the 20th perfect game in MLB history.

Personal life
Reynolds is married and graduated from South Catholic High School in Hartford, Connecticut. He played baseball at South Catholic under coach Tom DiFiore. Reynolds attended the University of Connecticut. He has three sisters.

See also 

List of Major League Baseball umpires

References

External links
Major league profile
Retrosheet

1968 births
Living people
Baseball people from Massachusetts
Sportspeople from Middlesex County, Massachusetts
University of Connecticut alumni
Major League Baseball umpires
People from Marlborough, Massachusetts